Shadrino is a rural locality (a selo) in Chesnokovsky Selsoviet of Mikhaylovsky District, Amur Oblast, Russia. The population was 205 as of 2018. There are 6 streets.

Geography 
Shadrino is located on the left bank of the Chesnokova River, 15 km southeast of Poyarkovo (the district's administrative centre) by road. Chesnokovo is the nearest rural locality.

References 

Rural localities in Mikhaylovsky District, Amur Oblast